Luis Daniel Vallejos Obregón (born 27 May 1981 in Santa Bárbara de Santa Cruz) is a Costa Rican former professional footballer.

Club career
A defensive midfielder, he made his debut for Herediano and played for Puntarenas. In January 2010 he left Herediano for Santos de Guápiles After playing for Santos de Guápiles, Vallejos decided to cease playing professional soccer in his country. He did however have a spell at second division Guanacasteca and played abroad for Guatemalan second division outfit Ayutla.

In summer 2014, Vallejos rejoined relegated Puntarenas in their bid to regain promotion to the Primera División.

International career
Vallejos played at the 2001 FIFA World Youth Championship finals in Argentina.

Vallejos made his senior debut for the Costa Rica national football team in a friendly against Japan just before the World Cup finals on April 12, 2002 and made 15 appearances, scoring no goals. He was a surprise inclusion into the team, but became a non-playing squad member at the 2002 FIFA World Cup.

He collected his final cap in a friendly international against China in September 2003.

References

External links
 

1981 births
Living people
People from Guanacaste Province
Association football defenders
Costa Rican footballers
Costa Rica international footballers
2002 FIFA World Cup players
2003 UNCAF Nations Cup players
2003 CONCACAF Gold Cup players
Olympic footballers of Costa Rica
Footballers at the 2004 Summer Olympics
Copa Centroamericana-winning players
C.S. Herediano footballers
Puntarenas F.C. players
Santos de Guápiles footballers
Costa Rican expatriate footballers
Expatriate footballers in Guatemala
Deportivo Ayutla players
Municipal Grecia players